The Cathedral Basilica of Our Lady is a Roman Catholic cathedral and minor basilica dedicated to the Blessed Virgin Mary located in Kabgayi, Rwanda.  The basilica is seat of the Diocese of Kabgayi.  The basilica was dedicated on October 22, 1992.

References

External links
Nativity mosaic at the Kabgayi Cathedral Basilica

Basilica churches in Africa
Roman Catholic cathedrals in Rwanda
20th-century Roman Catholic church buildings in Rwanda